B. Borooah College , established in 1943, is one of the oldest degree college situated in Guwahati, Assam. It was named after Bholanath Borooah a businessman from Nagaon. This college is affiliated with the Gauhati University.

Departments

Science
Physics
Mathematics
Chemistry
Statistics
Botany
Zoology
Geography

Arts
 Assamese
 Bengali
 English
Sanskrit
History
Education
Economics
Philosophy
Political Science
Hindi
Geography

Facilities

Hostel
The double storied building of B. Borooah College Hostel that exists was built in 1964 with the funds of the UGC, Assam Government and college itself. The two stories R.C.C building comprises total 31 rooms that accommodates 122 boarders of higher secondary, degree and master's degree students of the college. The hostel has a managing committee, comprising superintendent and faculty members of the college and headed by the Principal as president. Two monitors from final year degree students are appointed as monitor of ground and first floor to assist the superintendent of the hostel. A mess committee is also constructed each year to look after the mess and entire internal matter of the hostel.

Gymnasium
Institution provides all kinds of encouragement and opportunities to the students to develop their proficiency in sports. The institution has a well-equipped gymnasium hall with modern and sophisticated instruments. It was inaugurated by Former “Mr. World” Mahadeb Deka on 18 March 2013.

Alumni
 Adil Hussain
 Zubeen Garg
 Anwaruddin Choudhury
 Pijush Hazarika

References
 http://www.assamtribune.com/scripts/detailsnew.asp?id=dec0212/at09

External links
http://www.bborooahcollege.ac.in/
Hem Barua Library

Universities and colleges in Guwahati
Colleges affiliated to Gauhati University
Educational institutions established in 1943
1943 establishments in India